Anti-Palestinianism or anti-Palestinian racism refers to prejudice and discrimination against Palestinians by groups, individuals, or governments. It is sometimes referred to as a form of racism manifested in anti-Arab sentiment, though it may also be a political standpoint as well. The phenomenon is common in Israel, the United States, and Lebanon, among other countries.

Directed at an Arab group that is predominantly Muslim, anti-Palestinianism often overlaps with anti-Arabism and Islamophobia. Emad Moussa, writing on Mondoweiss, says that anti-Palestinianism is a form of bigotry, "a multi-layered form of prejudice, inseparable from the overall anti-Muslim and anti-Arab sentiment in the West". Pakistani author and professor Sunaina Maira, citing historian Shahzad Bashir in the context of labelling, states: "...an important aspect of anti-Palestinianism, that is, the moral panic whipped up about the "radicalization" of Muslim and Arab American youth is often accompanied by the charge that they are automatically anti-Semites if they are critical of the Israeli state's policies".

By location

Australia
In September 2021, the Arab Australian Federation (AAF) produced a document titled the "Sydney Statement on anti-Palestinianism". The statement was created as a response to the International Holocaust Remembrance Alliance's Working Definition of Antisemitism. The document claims that the statement was necessitated by "decades of discrimination against the Palestinian people", reflected through "Israel's military occupation of Palestinian land", the plight of Palestinian refugees, attacks against Palestinian life and property, and widespread anti-Palestinian stereotyping. The statement also claims that anti-Palestinianism "target[s] media, institutions, students and academics if they criticise Israel or sympathise with the Palestinian people". The Australia/Israel & Jewish Affairs Council (AIJAC) called the statement "odd and concerning", claiming that the statement entails a "broad and opportunistic appropriation of international rights" to suit a "self-serving narrative".

Austria

In 2020, the Austrian Parliament adopted a resolution condemning the BDS movement. The BDS movement condemned the resolution as "anti-Palestinian" and "anti-democratic".

Canada
In 2018, author and political activist Yves Engler criticized the New Democratic Party (NDP) for its conduct in respect of the Palestine Resolution that called for support of efforts to ban "settlement products from Canadian markets, and using other forms of diplomatic and economic pressure to end the [Israeli] occupation.". Engler said it "demonstrated the need to directly confront anti-Palestinianism within the party."

In 2020, the University of Toronto allegedly blocked the hiring of Valentina Azarova as director of the International Human Rights Program (IHRP) due to her pro-Palestinian activism. Dania Majid, president of the Arab Canadian Lawyers Association (ACLA), described this as an example that "anti-Palestinian racism is alive and well" in Canada.

France
In May 2021, the French interior minister Gérald Darmanin requested that the police ban a pro-Palestinian protest in Paris. The Parisian journalist Sihame Assbague described the decision as an expression of "French colonial solidarity with the Israeli occupation forces."

Germany
Anti-Palestinian sentiment is common in Germany. The German left, particularly the Antideutsch movement, has been noted for anti-Palestinian sentiment. Many pro-Israel non-Jewish Zionists on the German left regard being anti-Palestinian as connected to their solidarity with Jews.

In 2019, the Bundestag declared the BDS movement to be a form of antisemitism. In response, the BDS movement condemned the motion as anti-Palestinian. The Palestinian B.D.S. National Committee issued a statement declaring the motion an "anti-Palestinian...McCarthyite and unconstitutional resolution passed by the German Parliament."

British musician Brian Eno has argued that pro-Palestinian artists are subjected to "censorship and inquisitorial McCarthyism" due to the actions of the German government and anti-Palestinian groups.

Israel

Lebanon
Palestinian refugees in Lebanon are treated as second-class residents. Palestinians in Lebanon are denied citizenship, restricted from certain jobs, excluded from formal education, and forced to live in refugee camps.

United States
American public opinion has tended in favor of Israel and against Palestinians for a number of years, although pro-Palestinian sentiment has increased in the United States during the 21st century. In 2021, according to Gallup, only 30% of Americans had a favorable view of the Palestinian National Authority. Only 25% of Americans sympathized more with Palestinians than with Israelis, with 58% sympathizing with Israel. Only 34% of Americans believed that the United States should place more pressure on Israel in regards to the Israel-Palestine conflict. However, 52% of Americans supported an independent Palestinian state. Democrats are more likely than Republicans to have pro-Palestinian sentiments.

In her 1990 essay "Israel: Whose Country Is It Anyway?", the Jewish-American writer Andrea Dworkin wrote that American Jews are raised with anti-Palestinian sentiment, which she describes as "a deep and real prejudice against Palestinians that amounts to race-hate."

In May 2021, the Tayba Islamic Center in the Sheepshead Bay neighborhood of Brooklyn was vandalized with anti-Palestinian graffiti reading "Death 2 Palestine". The incident was investigated by the NYPD as a hate crime. Student leaders at the University of Michigan issued a statement denouncing the anti-Palestinian sentiment they alleged had been allowed to "run rampant" on campus, stating that Palestinian students had been "profoundly marginalized through censorship and threats."

In November 2021, Palestine Legal filed a complaint with Washington, D.C.'s Office for Human Rights against George Washington University, alleging that the university had discriminated against Palestinians in its offering of trauma services.

Examples
Opponents of anti-Palestinianism sometimes allege that it is as serious a moral failing as antisemitism, but believe that anti-Palestinianism goes unrecognized or underrecognized within Western societies.

After fashion retailer Zara condemned anti-Palestinian comments made by one of its senior designers in June 2021, the East Jerusalem born and raised model Qaher Harhash said the fashion industry should stand up against anti-Palestinian sentiment:
We usually see brands standing against anti-Semitism, but it's also time we see brands standing against anti-Palestinianism.

In 2015, Spanish BDS activists accused the Jewish-American rapper Matisyahu of being anti-Palestinian and temporarily succeeded in having his appearance at the Rototom Sunsplash festival cancelled.

Digital anti-Palestinianism
The censorship of Palestinian and pro-Palestinian voices on the internet, particularly on social media, has been referred to as "digital apartheid" or "digital occupation".

Facebook has been accused of anti-Palestinian bias by digital rights activists. Other websites accused of anti-Palestinian bias include Zoom, YouTube, Twitter, and PayPal.

See also
 Anti-BDS laws
 Characterization of Zionism as colonialism, ethnic cleansing, or racist
 List of people who oppose the BDS movement
 Palestinianism
 Death to Arabs
 Progressive except Palestine
 Racism in Jewish communities

Notes

Citations

Sources

External links
 Amazon, Israel, and the Occupation of Palestine, International Solidarity Movement
 In British Politics, Pro-Palestinian Activism Is Now Considered Criminal, Jacobin
  Arab Canadian Lawyers Association Report: Anti-Palestinian Racism: Naming, Framing and Manifestations

 
Anti-Arabism
Anti-national sentiment
Racism